Walter FitzWilliam Cotterell (died c.1388/9) was an Irish barrister and Crown official of the late fourteenth century. He was Serjeant-at-law (Ireland) and acted from time to time as a judge of gaol delivery and of assize. The evidence suggests that he was a conscientious and hard-working official who enjoyed the complete trust of the English Crown.

He was born in Kells, County Kilkenny, the son of William Cotterell. The family had a long-standing association with Kells, and later lived in Kilkenny city. His father was acting as a judge in the 1360s, as was John Cotterell, who was presumably Walter's uncle.

Career 

He was appointed King's Serjeant in 1374. By that time he was already a valued Crown servant, who had been entrusted in 1359 with collecting a subsidy. In 1373-4 he conducted "numerous inquisitions" on behalf of the Crown, and was given the power to arrest ships, for which labour he received a fee of 10 marks (£6.66). The inquisitions in question lasted for four weeks and his travels on official business required the use of eight horses. Shortly afterwards he was appointed to a three-man commission into the Crown's right of treasure trove in County Wexford, which lasted for 2 weeks; he did not receive a fee. The other two members were both serving High Court judges, John Keppock and William de Karlell, again an indication of Cotterell's high standing with the Crown. In 1374 he was summoned to a meeting of the Great Council, to be held in England to discuss Irish affairs. In 1375 he was commissioned as one of the  justices  for gaol delivery in Waterford city.

He never became a High Court judge, but in addition to sitting in gaol delivery as required, in 1380, when he was described as "Narrator Regis" (King's Serjeant), the Privy Council of Ireland appointed him as an acting judge of assize for Munster, County Kilkenny and Wexford. The judge assigned to ride that circuit, John Tirel, was unable or unwilling to act "on account of the dangers of the roads" (the journey from Dublin to Carlow was notoriously dangerous, as was life in Carlow much of the time, even though the Royal Courts sat there). Cotterell received a fee of £75 for his nine months in office, and a further years' fee for performing unspecified official duties in Leinster. He was in County Cork on official business in 1382. He was still King's Serjeant in 1385. In that year he was again required to act as an extra judge, to hear the King's Pleas in the Court of the Seneschal of the liberty of Kilkenny. In addition he and John de Sotheron, during his brief tenure as Lord Chief Justice of Ireland, were appointed to deal with those petitions which would normally be dealt with by the Lord Chancellor of Ireland, who was then absent in England.

In 1388 he received permission to go on a pilgrimage to Rome, and may have died on the journey or in Rome itself, as his name disappears from the official records thereafter. Chief Justice Tirel, for whom Cotterell had often acted as Deputy, was ordered to sit as Justice in Carlow in 1389. Cotterell's precise date of death is not recorded.

Family 
He had a son, William, who was a burgess of Kilkenny in the early 1380s. It is unclear if they were related to Sir Patrick Cotterell, who was Deputy Admiral of Ireland in 1412-14. Sir John Cotterell of Kells, who was executed with Sir Eustace le Poer (a member of one of the dominant landowning families in County Tipperary and  Kilkenny) for taking part in the rebellion of Maurice FitzGerald, 1st Earl of Desmond in 1346, was a cousin of William. Robert Cotterell, possibly another relative of William, was appointed a justice of the Court of King's Bench (Ireland) in 1388. Patrick Cotterell of Kilkenny received a royal pardon for various offences in 1407. A later William Cotterell, probably a direct descendant, was appointed justice and Keeper of the Peace for Kilkenny in 1431.

Notes

Sources
Hart, A. R. A History of the King's Serjeants-at-law in Ireland Dublin Four Courts Press 2000
Graves, James and Prim, John "The History, Architecture and Antiquities of the Cathedral Church of St Canice, Kilkenny" Dublin Hodges Smith and Co. 1857
Haydn, Joseph Book of Dignities London Longman, Brown, Green and Longmans 1851
Smyth, Constantine Joseph Chronicle of the Law Officers of Ireland London Butterworths 1839

Irish barristers
14th-century Irish judges
Serjeants-at-law (Ireland)
People from County Kilkenny
Members of the Privy Council of Ireland
1388 deaths